The Basilica of the Holy Apostles is a Romanesque church in Cologne (Köln), located near Innenstadt's busy . The former collegiate church is dedicated to the twelve Apostles.  It is one of the twelve Romanesque churches built in Cologne in that period.
 
The church has a basilical plan of nave and aisles, and like Groß St. Martin and St. Maria im Kapitol, has three apses at the east end making a trefoil plan. There is a single tower of 67 metres at the west.

See also 
 Twelve Romanesque churches of Cologne 
 Cologne Cathedral 
 German architecture
 Romanesque architecture
 List of regional characteristics of Romanesque churches 
 Romanesque secular and domestic architecture

References

Literature 
 Ralf van Bühren: Kunst und Kirche im 20. Jahrhundert. Die Rezeption des Zweiten Vatikanischen Konzils, Paderborn: Verlag Ferdinand Schöningh 2008
 Annerose Berners: St. Aposteln in Köln. Untersuchungen zur Geschichte eines mittelalterlichen Kollegiatstifts bis ins 15. Jahrhundert, 2 Bde., Diss. Bonn 2004
 Sabine Czymmek: Die Kölner romanischen Kirchen, Schatzkunst, Bd. 1, Köln 2008,
 Jörg Poettgen: Das spätgotische Geläute von St. Aposteln. Ein unbekanntes Werk des Kölner Meisters Johan van Andernach. In: Colonia Romanica II (1987) 
 Gottfried Stracke: Köln St. Aposteln, Stadtspuren Band 19 – 
 Norbert Nussbaum: St. Aposteln in Köln –

External links 
 
 official site

Innenstadt, Cologne
Roman Catholic churches in Cologne
Basilica churches in Germany
9th-century churches in Germany
Romanesque architecture in Germany
Cologne Apostel